Nick Kyrgios was the defending champion, but did not participate.

Federico Delbonis won the title, defeating Facundo Bagnis in the final, 6–4, 6–2.

Seeds

Draw

Finals

Top half

Bottom half

References
 Main Draw
 Qualifying Draw

Sarasota Open - Singles